NSW TrainLink the operator of country railway passenger services in the state of New South Wales, Australia, currently operates ten routes taken over from CountryLink in July 2013, as at July 2015:

Routes
Intercity routes taken over from Cityrail in July 2013 and coach services are not included.

Grafton XPT
(1 x Daily)

 Central
 Strathfield
 Hornsby
 Gosford
 Wyong
 Fassifern
 Broadmeadow
 Maitland
 Dungog
 Gloucester
 Wingham
 Taree
 Kendall
 Wauchope
 Kempsey
 Eungai
 Macksville
 Nambucca Heads
 Urunga
 Sawtell
 Coffs Harbour
 Grafton

Casino XPT
(1 x Daily)

 Central
 Strathfield
 Hornsby
 Gosford
 Wyong
 Fassifern
 Broadmeadow
 Maitland
 Dungog
 Gloucester
 Taree
 Kendall
 Wauchope
 Kempsey
 Macksville
 Nambucca Heads
 Urunga
 Sawtell
 Coffs Harbour
 Grafton
 Casino

Brisbane XPT
(1 x Daily)

 Central
 Strathfield
 Hornsby
 Gosford
 Wyong
 Fassifern
 Broadmeadow
 Maitland
 Dungog
 Taree
 Kendall
 Wauchope
 Kempsey
 Macksville
 Nambucca Heads
 Urunga
 Sawtell
 Coffs Harbour
 Grafton
 Casino
 Kyogle
 (Brisbane Roma Street)

Canberra Xplorer
(3 x Daily)

 Central (Sydney)
 Campbelltown
 Mittagong
 Bowral
 Moss Vale
 Bundanoon
 Goulburn
 Tarago
 Bungendore
 Queanbeyan
 Canberra

Melbourne XPT
(2 x Daily)

 Central (Sydney)
 Campbelltown
 Moss Vale
 Goulburn
 Gunning
 Yass Junction
 Harden
 Cootamundra
 Junee
 Wagga Wagga
 The Rock
 Henty
 Culcairn
 Albury
 Wangaratta
 Benalla
 Seymour
 Broadmeadows
 Southern Cross (Melbourne)

Griffith Xplorer
(1 x Weekly – from Sydney Saturdays; from Griffith Sundays)

 Central (Sydney)
 Campbelltown
 Moss Vale
 Goulburn
 Yass Junction
 Harden
 Cootamundra
 Junee
 Coolamon
 Narrandera
 Leeton
 Griffith

Dubbo XPT
(1 x Daily)

 Central (Sydney)
 Strathfield
 Parramatta
 Blacktown
 Penrith
 Katoomba
 Lithgow
 Rydal
 Tarana
 Bathurst
 Blayney
 Millthorpe
 Orange
 Stuart Town
 Wellington
 Geurie
 Dubbo

Broken Hill Xplorer

(1 x Weekly – from Sydney Monday; from Broken Hill Tuesday)

 Central (Sydney)
 Strathfield
 Parramatta
 Penrith
 Katoomba
 Lithgow
 Bathurst
 Blayney
 Orange
 Parkes
 Condobolin
 Euabalong West
 Ivanhoe
 Darnick
 Menindee
 Broken Hill

Northern Tablelands Xplorer
(1 x Daily)

 Central (Sydney)
 Strathfield
 Hornsby
 Gosford
 Wyong
 Fassifern
 Broadmeadow
 Maitland
 Singleton
 Muswellbrook
 Scone
 Murrurundi
 Willow Tree
 Quirindi
 Werris Creek

To Armidale
 Tamworth
 Kootingal
 Walcha Road
 Uralla
 Armidale

To Moree
 Gunnedah
 Boggabri
 Narrabri
 Bellata
 Moree

External links 
 

Routes
NSW
TrainLink routes